The Symphony No. 9 in E minor was the last symphony written by the English composer Ralph Vaughan Williams. He composed it during 1956 and 1957, and it was given its premiere performance in London by the Royal Philharmonic Orchestra conducted by Sir Malcolm Sargent on 2 April 1958, in the composer's eighty-sixth year. The work was received respectfully but, at first, without great enthusiasm. Its reputation has subsequently grown, and the symphony has entered the repertoire, in the concert hall and on record, with the majority of recordings from the 1990s and the 21st century.

In his early sketches for the symphony, Vaughan Williams made explicit reference to characters and scenes in Thomas Hardy's Tess of the d'Urbervilles. By the time the symphony was complete he had deleted the programmatic details, but musical analysts have found many points in which the work nonetheless evokes the novel.

Background and first performances

By the mid-1950s Vaughan Williams, in his eighties, was regarded as the Grand Old Man of English music, greatly as he disliked the term. Between 1910 and 1955 he had composed eight symphonies, and early in 1956, before the premiere of the Eighth he began to think about and make sketches for a ninth.

During the early stages of the composition of the symphony, Vaughan Williams conceived first a musical depiction of Salisbury, the Plain and Stonehenge and then an evocation of Thomas Hardy's Tess of the d'Urbervilles, set in the same surroundings. The programmatic elements disappeared as work progressed. Existing sketches show that in the early stages of composition certain passages related to specific people and events in the novel: in some of the manuscripts the first movement is headed "Wessex Prelude" and the heading "Tess" appears above sketches for the second movement. By the time the work was complete, the composer was at pains to characterise it as absolute music: 

The work was commissioned by and dedicated to the Royal Philharmonic Society. It was complete by November 1957 when a piano arrangement was played to a group of the composer's friends, including the composers Arthur Bliss and Herbert Howells and the critic Frank Howes. A fortnight before the premiere, Vaughan Williams arranged (and paid for) a three-hour rehearsal at which the symphony was played through twice; after hearing the piece he made some minor adjustments in preparation for the premiere.

Sir Malcolm Sargent conducted the first public performance at a Royal Philharmonic Society concert at the Royal Festival Hall, London on 2 April 1958, the central item in the programme, between Kodály's Concerto for Orchestra and Berlioz's Harold in Italy. He again conducted the symphony on 5 August 1958 at a Prom concert, broadcast by the BBC. The work received its North American premiere on 10 August, conducted by William Steinberg at the Vancouver International Festival. Leopold Stokowski conducted the US premiere at Carnegie Hall, New York on 25 September, and Sir John Barbirolli conducted the Philadelphia Orchestra in the work in December of that year.

Music
The orchestral forces required are: 
Woodwinds: piccolo, two flutes, two oboes, cor anglais, two clarinets (in B), bass clarinet (in B), two bassoons, contrabassoon, two alto saxophones (in E), tenor saxophone (in B) 
Brass: four horns (in F), two trumpets (in B), flügelhorn (in B), three trombones, tuba 
Percussion: timpani, side drum, tenor drum, bass drum, cymbals, triangle, large gong, tam-tam, deep bells, glockenspiel, xylophone, celesta 
Strings: two harps, and strings

The symphony is in four movements. Timings in performance vary considerably: at the premiere Sargent and the Royal Philharmonic took 30m 25s, which is nearer than most subsequent performances on record to the composer's metronome markings, but is felt by some critics to be too fast in places. In preparation for the first commercial recording of the work in August 1958, Sir Adrian Boult discussed the ending of the last movement with Vaughan Williams, which he felt was too abrupt. Vaughan Williams suggested that he could play that section "a good deal slower" if he wished while he considered Boult's suggestion that he add 20 or 30 measures. Timings of studio recordings of the work have ranged from 29m 45s (Kees Bakels, 1996) to 38m 30 (André Previn, 1971), with 34 minutes or so a more typical duration.

1. Moderato maestoso

In the composer's published analysis the Moderato first movement is described as not in strict sonata form but obeying the general principles of statement, contrast and repetition. The symphony opens in E minor, in  time, with a held unison E in four octaves, followed by a slow theme for low brasses and winds over the sustained E. This leads to the first solo entrance of the three saxophones in a solemn theme in triads over a quiet E minor chord. The clarinets, accompanied by harp chords, introduce a gentler theme in G minor that elides into the G major that conventional sonata form would suggest. This returns in fuller form later in the movement, forming the recapitulation section, and now played by a solo violin, before the movement returns to the opening theme and ends with a saxophone cadence (à la Napolitaine, in the composer's phrase).

2.  Andante sostenuto

The slow movement, marked Andante sostenuto, opens in G minor,  time, with a theme for the solo flügelhorn. According to the musicologist Alain Frogley and others, the composer's original programmatic conceptions are essentially unaltered in the score despite his deletion of the labelling of themes, and in the opening it is possible to hear the sound of the wind blowing through Stonehenge. Later in the movement the music evokes Tess, the pursuing constabulary, her arrest and the bell striking eight before her hanging. Vaughan Williams, avoiding mention of the original programme, describes the flügelhorn theme as "borrowed from an early work of the composer's, luckily long since scrapped, but changed so that its own father would hardly recognize it". He continues:  The movement closes on a pianissimo chord of C major sustained across four bars.

3. Scherzo

A subsidiary theme is developed in canon. The music is interrupted by a repetition of the opening dissonance, out of which the solo B-flat saxophone and the side drum bring the movement to a quiet end.

4. Finale

The last movement, marked Andante tranquillo, is in two distinct sections, the first in repeated binary form and the second a sonata allegro with coda. The first section begins with a long cantilena on the violins and then the violas, with clarinet counterpoint. The second theme, for horns, is followed by a repetition of both themes, before a short phrase that occurs throughout the movement introduces the second section, a viola theme, soft at first and becoming louder and contrapuntal, for full orchestra before ending on an E major triad, fortissimo but fading away to silence.

Critical reception

According to Vaughan Williams's biographer Michael Kennedy, after the first performances, "there was no denying the coolness of the critics' reception of the music. Its enigmatic mood puzzled them, and more attention was therefore paid to the use of the flügel horn and to the flippant programme note."  The flügelhorn player at the premiere remarked that all the press coverage was about the instrument, to the detriment of serious discussion of the symphony as a work. An example of what Kennedy describes as the composer's flippancy in his programme note concerns the instrumentation: 
In the American journal Notes, R. Murray Schafer commented that although most libraries would wish to acquire the score because of Vaughan Williams's reputation as a symphonist, "I find it difficult...to discover much more than a numerical value in the work". He complained about the saxophones and flügelhorn: "all this extra color seems to be employed simply in thickening the middle-orchestra texture. … The formal mastery is still present, but I don't think it saves the work". Other critics in America were more impressed. In the Musical Courier, Gideon Waldrop described the symphony as "a work of beauty ... lyricism, sheer tonal beauty and thorough craftsmanship were in evidence throughout" and in The New York Times, Harold C. Schonberg wrote that "the symphony is packed with strong personal melody from beginning to end ... A mellow glow suffuses the work, as it does the work of many veteran composers who seem to gaze retrospectively over their careers ... the Ninth Symphony is a masterpiece".

In the decades following his death, the music of Vaughan Williams was to a considerable extent ignored by musical academics and critics, although not by the public: his music remained popular in the concert hall and on record. In the mid-1990s the critical and musicological tide turned in his favour. So far as the Ninth Symphony was concerned, the earlier view that it said nothing new began to be supplanted by the recognition that although it was, as The Times put it in 2008, "the synthesis and summation of all that had gone before", the music was visionary, violent, elusive and ambiguous. In 2011, in a note for the San Francisco Symphony Orchestra, Larry Rothe wrote, "Like Beethoven’s final symphony, this one portrays huge conflicts and superhuman striving. Then, in its midst, a light-drenched seascape unfolds, but the vision retreats as suddenly as it appeared. Vaughan Williams had not composed music so angry and assertive since his Sixth Symphony". Frogley and others believe that the work became better understood once the programmatic element became widely known.

Recordings

Notes, references and sources

Notes

References

Sources
 
 
 
 
 
 * 

 
 
 

Symphony 009
1957 compositions
Compositions in E minor
Adaptations of works by Thomas Hardy